James B. Hecker is a United States Air Force general who serves as the commander of United States Air Forces in Europe – Air Forces Africa and Allied Air Command since June 27, 2022. Before that, he served as the commander and president of the Air University from November 2019 to June 2022. and also previously served as the vice director for operations of the Joint Staff.

He is from Arnold, California and graduated from the United States Air Force Academy in 1989.

Awards and decorations

Effective dates of promotions

References

Living people
Place of birth missing (living people)
Recipients of the Air Force Distinguished Service Medal
Recipients of the Defense Superior Service Medal
Recipients of the Legion of Merit
United States Air Force generals
United States Air Force personnel of the War in Afghanistan (2001–2021)
Year of birth missing (living people)